Rosa María Sardá i Támaro (30 July 194111 June 2020) was a Spanish actress. Her career in theater ranks her as one of the leading actresses of the Spanish scene.

Early life
Sardà was born in Barcelona in 1941, and grew up in the Sant Andreu district of the capital, where her career as a stage actress began. She was the elder sister of the journalist and writer .

Career
Self-taught, Sardà began to do amateur theater in her hometown, Horta. In 1962, she made the leap to professional theater in the Dora Santacreu and Carlos Lucena company with the play Cena de matrimonios by Alfonso Paso; she then moved to the Alejandro Ulloa company and, later, to that of Pau Garsaball, with the work En Baldiri de la Costa. In the 1970s, she starred in various theatre productions, such as The House of Bernarda Alba.

Later, she worked in television, in 1975, starring in Una vella, coneguda olor, by Josep Maria Benet i Jornet and in 1979, leading the program Festa amb Rosa Maria Sardà. She also started doing movies with El vicari d'Olot (1981), by Ventura Pons.

During the 1980s, she presented the television show Ahí te quiero ver.

In 1993, she starred in Why Do They Call It Love When They Mean Sex?, for which she won the Goya Award for Best Supporting Actress. The next year she was awarded the Creu de Sant Jordi, but she later returned it in 2017 (see personal life section).

In 2001, she starred in No Shame, for which she again won the Goya Award for Best Supporting Actress. The next year, she starred in the comedy My Mother Likes Women. In 2005, she starred in the television series Abuela de verano. Her son, Pol Mainat, starred alongside her.

In 2010, she was awarded a Gold Medal from the Spanish Film Academy. In 2016, she was awarded the Feroz de Honor (Feroz of Honour). She was due to receive the Fotogramas de Plata award in 2020, but the ceremony was cancelled.

She hosted the Goya Awards gala three times throughout her career. Critic Javier Zurro has considered her the best host in the history of the awards.

Personal life
In 1975 they had a son Pol Mainat, who also become an actor. Sardà and Mainat divorced circa 2002.

Sardà was always a politically committed person. She defined herself as “radically republican, federalist and socialist." In 2017, Sardà returned her Creu de Sant Jordi award, one of the highest decorations of the Catalonian Government, due to her opposition to the Catalan "procés" and the corruption scandal of former Catalan president Jordi Pujol.

In 2014, Sardà was diagnosed with lymphoma, and later took a hiatus from acting. She died from the disease on 11 June 2020 in Barcelona, aged 78.

Selected filmography

Theatre 
Her career at theatre was prolific, below some notable works:

Actress
 1964: Los cinco minutos de Margot by Louis Verneuil. Premiered at Teatre Guimerà (Barcelona).
 1968: Las noches bajas de Ana o mi marido tiene un turca, by Rafael Richart. At Teatre Victòria (Barcelona).
 1976: Roses roges per a mi by Sean O'Casey
 1976: Terra baixa by Àngel Guimerà
 1978: Tot esperant Godot by Samuel Beckett
 1978: Sopa de pollastre amb ordi by Arnold Wesker
 1979: Quan la ràdio parlava de Franco by Josep Maria Benet i Jornet
 1980: El balcó by Jean Genet
 1982: Duet per a un sol violí by Tom Kempinski.
 1982: Yo me bajo en la próxima, ¿y usted? by 'Adolfo Marsillach
 1985: Mare Coratge by Bertolt Brecht
 1992: L'hostal de la Glòria by Josep Maria de Sagarra
 2004: Wit by Margaret Edson
2009: La casa de Bernarda Alba by Federico García Lorca
 2012: Dubte by John Patrick Shanley

Director 
 1989: Ai carai, by Josep Maria Benet i Jornet
 1994: Shirley Valentine by Willy Russell
 1994: Fugaç by Josep Maria Bernet i Jornet
 1996: El visitant by Eric-Emmanuel Schmitt
 1999: Cantonada Brossa, jointly with Josep Maria Mestres, Josep Muntanyès i Lluís Pasqual. Crítica de Barcelona award

Awards and honors

Notes

References

External links

Rosa Maria Sardà works and awards (pdf in Spanish) (Archived)

1941 births
2020 deaths
20th-century Spanish actresses
21st-century Spanish actresses
Actresses from Barcelona
Deaths from cancer in Spain
Deaths from lymphoma
Spanish women comedians
Spanish television presenters
Best Supporting Actress Goya Award winners
Spanish women television presenters
Film actresses from Catalonia
Television actresses from Catalonia